Yusef Deh (also Romanized as Yūsef Deh) is a village in Rudboneh Rural District, Rudboneh District, Lahijan County, Gilan Province, Iran. At the 2006 census, its population was 263, in 81 families.

References 

Populated places in Lahijan County